Vahafolau Esikia (born 28 November 1979 in Nieafu) was an American rugby union centre. He was a member of the United States national rugby union team and participated with the squad at the 2007 Rugby World Cup. His uncle Alatini Saulala represented  at the 1999 Rugby World Cup.

He was the President and Director of Operations for the Las Vegas Rugby Academy.

He is now the Assistant coach for the Utah warriors select team. He is living in Salt lake city, Utah. He is now married to retired professional boxer, Sana Esikia. He has 8 total kids. He was offered a football scholarship to Oregon University but turned it down to serve a 2-year mission in Connecticut. He has 2 other siblings, a brother and a sister.

References

External links

1979 births
Living people
Tongan emigrants to the United States
Rugby union scrum-halves
American rugby union players
United States international rugby union players